Prison Train is a 1938 American crime drama film directed by Gordon Wiles. Released by Equity Pictures Corporation, the film stars Fred Keating and Dorothy Comingore (billed as Linda Winters). Burlesque dancer Faith Bacon also appears in the film. It was her first and last film role.

Cast
 Fred Keating as Frankie Terris
 Dorothy Comingore as Louise Terris
 Clarence Muse as Train Steward/Sam
 Faith Bacon as Maxine
 Alexander Leftwich as Manny Robbins
 James Blakeley as Joe Robbins
 Sam Bernard as George
 John Pearson as Red
 Nestor Paiva as Morose
 Val Stanton as Sullen
 Peter Potter as Bill Adams
 Kit Guard as Guard
 Franklyn Farnum as The Lawyer
 George Lloyd as Bull

External links

1938 films
1938 crime drama films
1930s prison films
American black-and-white films
American crime drama films
American independent films
American prison drama films
Films directed by Gordon Wiles
Films produced by B. F. Zeidman
Rail transport films
1930s independent films
1930s English-language films
1930s American films